Polbain is a remote crofting township, located on the north Badentarbat Bay  on the west coast of Scotland, in western Ross-shire, Scottish Highlands and is in the Scottish council area of Highland. The village overlooks the Summer Isles.

The Brochs of Coigach is a small residential accommodation project that was completed in November 2011.

References

Populated places in Ross and Cromarty